Gol Bolagh or Golbolagh may refer to:
 Gol Bolagh, Kurdistan
 Gol Bolagh, Howmeh, Kurdistan Province
 Gol Bolagh, Zanjan